Dichomeris ferrogra is a moth in the family Gelechiidae. It was described by Hou-Hun Li and Hong-Jian Wang in 1997. It is found in Yunnan, China.

The wingspan is about 13 mm. The forewings are fuscous, without distinct maculation (spots), except for a fascia at three-fourths with its outside silvery grey. The termen is fuscous. The hindwings are grey.

References

Moths described in 1996
ferrogra